Constance Smith,  Mrs Spencer Smith (née Constanze Baronne de Herbert Rathkeal; 1785-1829) - wife of a British diplomat John Spencer Smith, known as Florence in several Byron's poems.

Daughter of baron Herbert, Austrian ambassador to Constantinople. Heroine of Marquis de Salvo's book about her escape from Napoleon and Memoirs of the Duchess D' Abrantés.

Poems
Lord Byron fell in love with her in Malta in 1809.

 To Florence (September 1809) 
Lines written in an album at Malta (September 14, 1809)
Stanzas composed during a thunderstorm (October 11, 1809) 
Stanzas written in passing the Ambracian gulf (November 14, 1809) 
The spell is broke... (Athens, January 16, 1810) 
 Childe Harold's Pilgrimage, II,  xxxii-xxxiii.

Sources
 Marquis de Salvo. Travels in the year 1806 from Italy to England: through the Tyrol, Styria, Bohemia, Gallicia, Poland and Livonia : containing the particulars of the liberation of Mrs. Spencer Smith from the hands of the French police. (Translated from the original mss. in Italian, by W. Fraser) Troy, N.Y. : Wright, Goodenow, & Stockwell, 1808
 Memoirs of the Duchess D' Abrantés (Madame Junot). J. & J. Harper, 1832
 Francis Henry Gribble. The Love Affairs of Lord Byron. 
 Grosskurth, Phyllis: Byron: The Flawed Angel. Hodder, 1997. .

Links
 Letters
 Letters
 Autograph

References

Lord Byron
1785 births
1829 deaths
Expatriates from the Holy Roman Empire in the Ottoman Empire